Five-color flag or five-colored flag may refer to:

 The Five Races Under One Union flag, the National Flag of the Republic of China between 1912 and 1928.
 The Flag of the State of Manchuria, which is based on Five Races Under One Union flag.
 Vietnamese five-color flags, various five-colored flag designs traditionally used in traditional and religious contexts in Vietnamese culture